The All-WCHA Hockey Teams are composed of players at all positions from teams that are members of the Western Collegiate Hockey Association (WCHA), an NCAA Division I hockey-only conference. Each year, from 1959–60 onward, at the conclusion of the WCHA regular season, the head coaches of each member team vote for players to be placed on each all-sir team. The First Team and Second Team have been named in each WCHA Hockey season with a Third Team added in 1995–96; a Rookie Team was added starting in 1990–91.

The all-conference teams are composed of one goaltender, two defensemen, and three forwards. If a tie occurred for the final selection at any position, both players were included as part of the greater all-conference team; if a tie resulted in an increase in the number of superior all-stars, the inferior team would not be reduced in number (as happened in 1963–64). Players may only appear once per year on any of the first, second, or third teams but a freshman may appear on both the rookie team and one of the other all-conference teams.

In 1951–52, the Midwest Collegiate Hockey League (MCHL) formed as a conference. Two years later, it changed its name to the Western Intercollegiate Hockey League (WIHL). By 1957–58, however, a major disagreement over recruiting caused the dissolution of the conference with all member teams becoming independent schools for the following season. After one season without a formalized conference, all of the schools involved in the spat discovered that not being in a conference was worse than the alternative so the WCHA was formed. Because all of the WCHA founding teams played in the WIHL/MCHL, the former league's all-star teams (1951–1958) are included in this list.

After the Big Ten formed a college hockey conference starting in 2013–14, the WCHA lost 8 of its member teams from the previous season (Colorado College, Denver, Minnesota, Minnesota-Duluth, Nebraska-Omaha, North Dakota, St. Cloud State and Wisconsin), leaving Michigan Tech as the only founding member remaining in the WCHA.

All-conference teams
See footnotes.

''Note: There were no all-conference teams for the 1958–1959 season, because the original conference dissolved in 1958.

First Team

1950s

1960s

1970s

1980s

1990s

2000s

2010s

2020s

First Team players by school

Final Teams

Previous Teams

Multiple appearances

Second Team

1950s

1960s

1970s

1980s

1990s

2000s

2010s

2010s

Second Team players by school

Final Teams

Previous Teams

Multiple appearances

Third Team

1990s

2000s

2010s

2020s

Third Team players by school

Final Teams

Previous Teams

Multiple appearances

Rookie Team

1990s

2000s

2010s

2020s

Rookie Team players by school

Final Teams

Previous Teams

See also
WCHA Hockey Awards

References

External links
WCHA First All-Star Team (Incomplete)
WCHA Second All-Star Team (Incomplete)
WCHA Third All-Star Team (Incomplete)
WCHA All-Rookie Team (Incomplete)

Western Collegiate Hockey Association
WCHA All